Creed Bratton (born William Charles Schneider, February 8, 1943) is an American actor, singer and musician. A former member of the rock band the Grass Roots, he is best known for playing a fictionalized version of himself on the NBC sitcom The Office, which earned him five nominations for the Screen Actors Guild Award for Outstanding Performance by an Ensemble in a Comedy Series.

Early life and education
Bratton was born William Charles Schneider in Los Angeles, and grew up in Coarsegold, California, a small town near Yosemite National Park.

Musical career

Early years
Bratton adopted his new name while on a global excursion as a traveling musician. He traveled through Europe, Africa and the Middle East. He played guitar at a large folk festival in Israel, appearing with his group the Young Californians. Fellow American and guitarist Warren Entner witnessed Bratton's performance and asked to give him a call when he got back to the United States. In 1966, they formed a partnership and recruited the remaining members needed for their group, the 13th Floor. Bratton played lead guitar, Rick Coonce played drums, Entner played rhythm guitar and Kenny Fukomoto played bass. The Young Californians recorded a demo and sent it to Dunhill, a new record company headed by Lou Adler.

The Grass Roots

Producers/songwriters P. F. Sloan and Steve Barri heard the demo and liked it. They needed new band members for a folk-rock group that they had created in 1965. The 13th Floor lost their bass player to the draft during this time, and quickly recruited Rob Grill, changing the band's name to the "Grass Roots" for prior name recognition. The group went straight to the Top 10 with the song "Let's Live for Today" in 1967 and toured the United States. Iconic hit songs such as "Midnight Confessions" cemented the group's standing as major contributors to the rock-music scene.

The Grass Roots had top songwriters offering their best songs to them and wrote many songs themselves. For their major songs, music on the recordings was played by the LA studio musicians known as the Wrecking Crew. Bratton co-wrote the songs "Beatin' Round the Bush", "No Exit" and "Hot Bright Lights", and self-composed "Dinner for Eight" and "House of Stone". He sang lead vocals on "This Precious Time" and "Dinner for Eight". Bratton played with the group on its albums Let's Live for Today, Feelings, Golden Grass (a compilation) and Lovin' Things. Three of the albums charted, and Golden Grass received a gold record certification. He took part in ten of the group's singles, eight of which charted; "Midnight Confessions" received a gold record certification.

The Grass Roots played at the Fantasy Fair and Magic Mountain Music Festival on Sunday, June 11, 1967, during the "Summer of Love" as their top-ten hit "Let's Live for Today" was hitting the airwaves. Though the music festival occurred before the Monterey Pop Festival, it was not filmed as was the latter festival (see List of electronic music festivals). On Sunday, October 27, 1968, the group played at the San Francisco Pop Festival and then played at the Los Angeles Pop Festival and Miami Pop Festival in December as the top-ten hit "Midnight Confessions" was becoming popular.

In April 1969, Bratton became frustrated by Dunhill's refusal to allow the band to write its own songs and play the instruments on its records (although the members did play alone at concerts). After a disastrous appearance at the Fillmore West in April 1969, Bratton was asked to leave the band.

Solo years
In 2001 and 2002, Bratton released three albums showcasing his solo recordings since the 1960s with the assistance of Peter White. In 2007, he presented an induction award to the Wrecking Crew at the Musicians Hall of Fame. In 2008, he released another album of new music with producer Jon Tiven. In 2010, Bratton released an album titled "Bounce Back" with producer Dave Way. In 2011, Bratton released an album of greatest hits from his first three solo albums, titled "Demo". In 2010 and 2012, Bratton performed live at the SXSW festival. In 2013, Bratton released an original work in three acts as an audio biography titled Tell Me About It. Songs ranged from those recently written to pieces that he had written decades before. Bratton states that he listens to much jazz and classical music.

On January 18, 2014, Bratton joined his friend Zachary Scot Johnson for a duet for the 500th consecutive day of the thesongadayproject on YouTube.

Acting career

Bratton began to pursue an acting career in 1975. He has appeared in films such as Mask and Heart Like a Wheel. He was a cast member, playing a fictional version of himself, on NBC's Emmy and SAG award-winning The Office. In the episode "Booze Cruise", he speaks about his time with the Grass Roots on a deleted scene. In the episode "money" from season 4, he says "he never goes bankrupt" as all his debt "is always transfered to William Charles Schneider", actor's birth name, while holding on camera an allegedly fake passport. In the series finale, his character is revealed to have been in the Grass Roots as well as committing many crimes. This episode also features Bratton performing his song "All the Faces".

In 2008, he appeared in a short film with Kyle Gass titled Just One Of The Gynos, which won an award for best short film at the 2008 Malibu International Film Festival. He appeared in the feature film Labor Pains in 2009. His recent film projects are The Ghastly Love of Johnny X, written, produced and directed by Paul Bunnell; I Am Ben, written, produced and directed by Mathew Brady and Gaelan Connell; and Terri produced by David Guy Levy. Terri was selected by the Sundance Film Festival 2011 to appear in the US dramatic competition. It was one of only 16 films selected from 1,102 submissions to the US dramatic category. In 2012, he appeared as special guest star in Staged with Brandon Olive who appeared with him in Just One Of The Gynos. In 2013, he starred in Saving Lincoln, a biography set during the American Civil War.

Filmography

Film

Television

Web

Video games

Discography

Singles

++ - Gold Record - RIAA Certification

Albums

++ - Gold Record - RIAA Certification

References

External links

The-GrassRoots.com - Official Site
Creed Bratton at MySpace
[ Creed at AMG]
Interview with Creed Bratton, Rocker Magazine 2013, about new record, finale of The Office
Interview with Creed Bratton, Submerge Magazine 2015, about his career as an actor and musician

1943 births
Living people
American male film actors
American male television actors
American male singer-songwriters
American folk guitarists
American male guitarists
American rock guitarists
Singer-songwriters from California
Male actors from Los Angeles
People from Coarsegold, California
Guitarists from Los Angeles
20th-century American comedians
21st-century American comedians
20th-century American guitarists
Comedians from California
20th-century American male musicians
21st-century American guitarists
21st-century American male singers
21st-century American singers